Nevus comedonicus (also known as a comedo nevus) is characterized by closely arranged, grouped, often linear, slightly elevated papules that have at their center keratinous plugs resembling comedones.

See also 
 Nevus comedonicus syndrome
 Skin lesion
 List of cutaneous conditions

References 

Cutaneous conditions
Epidermal nevi, neoplasms, and cysts